The Rutland Recreation Ground is a cricket ground in Ilkeston, Derbyshire (not the historical county of Rutland, as the name may suggest). The Derbyshire first XI played at the ground regularly between 1925 and 1994, with the ground hosting at least one County Championship match - and sometimes as many as three or four – each year until 1978. The ground also saw John Player League matches in the 1970s. The ground hosted 93 first-class matches and 16 List A matches.
 
Game Information:
{| class="wikitable"
|-
! Game Type
! No. of Games
|-
| County Championship Matches
| 89
|-
| limited-over county matches
| 16
|-
| Twenty20 matches
| 0
|}
 
Game Statistics: first-class:
{| class="wikitable"
|-
! Category
! Information
|-
| Highest Team Score
| Derbyshire (529/7dec against Nottinghamshire) in 1952
|-
| Lowest Team Score
| Middlesex (54 against Derbyshire) in 1977
|-
| Best Batting Performance
| John Langridge (234 Runs for Sussex against Derbyshire in 1949
|-
| Best Bowling Performance
| Tich Freeman (9/50 for Kent against Derbyshire) in 1930
|}
 
Game Statistics: one-day:
{| class="wikitable"
|-
! Category
! Information
|-
| Highest Team Score
| Somerset (248/4 in 60 overs against Derbyshire) in 1977
|-
| Lowest Team Score
| Derbyshire (119 in 40 overs against Essex) in 1976
|-
| Best Batting Performance
| Brian Rose (128 Runs for Somerset against Derbyshire in 1977
|-
| Best Bowling Performance
| Alan Ward (6/24 for Derbyshire against Essex) in 1976
|}

References

External links
 Cricinfo Website - Ground Page
 Cricket Archive page

Cricket grounds in Derbyshire
Ilkeston
Sports venues completed in 1925